Agnihotri is an Indian Hindu Brahmin surname derived from the Sanskrit word Agnihotra. The term Agnihotri originally referred to the Hindu Brahmins who maintained the sacred fire during the fire rituals.

People with this surname include:

 Atul Agnihotri (born 1970), Bollywood actor
 Apurva Agnihotri, Indian actor
 Bharat Agnihotri (born 1953), member of the Alberta Liberal Party.
 Mezhathol Agnihothri (born 4th century AD), Shrauta High Priest who revived the ancient traditions of Yaagam in Bharatam
 Rati Agnihotri (born 1960), veteran Indian actress
 Shiv Narayan Agnihotri (born 1850), founder of the Deva Samaj
 Shilpa Saklani Agnihotri (born 1962), television actress
 Satish K. Agnihotri (born 1956), Madras high court judge
 Vivek Agnihotri, Indian Bollywood director

References

Hindu surnames